Rhescuporis III (Tiberios Iulios Rheskouporis Philocaesar Philoromaios Eusebes, flourished 3rd century – died 228) was a Roman client king of the Bosporan Kingdom. Like many of the other late Bosporan kings, Rhescuporis III is known mainly from coinage, meaning that the historical events of his reign are largely unknown. His coins are known from the period 211–228. He is known from an inscription to have been the son of his predecessor, Sauromates II.

Rhescuporis III is also known from inscriptions to have been the father of his successor, Cotys III, and was perhaps also the father of Sauromates III.

See also
 Bosporan Kingdom
 Roman Crimea

References

Monarchs of the Bosporan Kingdom
Roman client rulers
228 deaths
3rd-century monarchs in Europe
Year of birth unknown
Rhescuporis, Tiberius 3